Senator Archer may refer to:

Brian Archer (1929–2013), Australian Senator from Tasmania from 1975 to 1994
Frank B. Archer (1858–1914), Ohio State Senate
William Beatty Archer (1793–1870), Illinois Senate
William S. Archer (1789–1855), U.S. Senator from 1841 to 1847